Saint Reverianus of Autun (also Revenerius, Rivianus, Reverentianus, Reveriano, Reverie) (died June 1, 273 AD) was a 3rd-century bishop of Autun.

Life
According to tradition, Reverianus was of Italian origin, he was sent by Pope Felix I to evangelize the Aedui, a Gallic people of Gallia Lugdunensis and is considered the "apostle of the Morvan.”

According to Usuard, he was persecuted during the reign of the Emperor Aurelian.  According to tradition, Reverianus' preaching and conversions came to the attention of Emperor Aurelian, who was visiting the province of Sens at the time. 
Also executed with Reverianus were his companion, named St. Paul or Paulus of Autun, along with 10 other followers.

According to one source, “the name [Reverianus] is not mentioned by earlier writers, and the first bishop of Autun seems to have been Reticius, who was present at the Synod of Rome A.D. 313, and at Arles in the following year." Reverianus may have been revered as a bishop because he was the leader of this group of preachers. He may not have been executed at Autun itself but at the site of the town named after him. According to a tradition at Nevers, Reverianus was executed outside of the city walls of that city.

Veneration
In the 4th century, with freedom of worship granted to Christians by the Edict of Milan (313 AD), a monastic cell was built over the graves of these martyrs.
	
This monastic cell became in 866 the oratory of St. Révérien, which was granted by Charles the Fat to the chapter of Nevers. It had been previously under the jurisdiction of the Benedictines of the Abbey of Saint Martin d'Autun. In 1076, this monastery became affiliated with Abbey of Cluny. In the 13th century, the present church of St. Révérien was built according to the Cluniac style.

Another tradition celebrated by the Abbey of Notre-Dame de Nevers held that Reverianus died with his companions near this site, near the spring that still bears his name.

Of his relics, only a piece of Reverianus' head have been preserved. The relic was kept at Villy-le-Moutier (in the Canton of Nuits-Saint-Georges), a village to the east of the city of Beaune.  Until 1836, Reverianus' head was carried in procession to the church of Saint-Nicolas de Beaune during times of great drought.  Crowds from the city and the surrounding areas would pray for rain.

References

Sources 
 Jacques Baudoin: "Grand livre des Saints, culte et iconographie" Ed Créer. 2006. 519.p. fiche n°484, p. 419.
 Abbé François Adolphe Chauve-Bertrand: "L'église romane de Saint Révérien " in Bulletin de la Société scientifique et artistique de Clamecy 74e année 3e sem n°26. 1950; p. 88–110 – idem 85e année 3e sem n°36. 1961: " Sanctus Reverianus". – et n°3 . série 37 de 1962. p. 68–83.
 Les moines de Ramsgate: "Livre des Saints". Ed A&C Black Publishers 2002 Anglais.655. p. 7e Edition.()

Bishops of Autun
273 deaths
3rd-century Gallo-Roman people
Gallo-Roman saints
Year of birth unknown